Asura xanthophaea is a moth of the family Erebidae. It is found in Ethiopia.

References

xanthophaea
Moths described in 1977
Moths of Africa